Windsor Hill Quarry is a 0.8 hectare geological Site of Special Scientific Interest near Shepton Mallet on the Mendip Hills in Somerset, adjacent to the Windsor Hill Marsh biological Site of Special Scientific Interest. It was notified in 1971.

It is a Geological Conservation Review site for vertebrate studies in which examples of the tritylodont Oligokyphus were identified.

The disused quarry was connected to the Somerset and Dorset Joint Railway until 1957 when the sidings were removed.

See also
 Quarries of the Mendip Hills

References

External links
 English Nature website (SSSI information)

Sites of Special Scientific Interest in Somerset
Sites of Special Scientific Interest notified in 1971
Geology of Somerset
Quarries in the Mendip Hills